The 1962 Northern Illinois Huskies football team represented Northern Illinois University as a member of the Interstate Intercollegiate Athletic Conference (IIAC) during the 1962 NCAA College Division football season. Led by seventh-year head coach Howard Fletcher, the Huskies compiled an overall record of 8–2 with a mark of 3–1 in conference play, plaching second in the IIAC. The team played home games at the 5,500-seat Glidden Field, located on the east end of campus, in DeKalb, Illinois.

Schedule

References

Northern Illinois
Northern Illinois Huskies football seasons
Northern Illinois Huskies football